Valdemaras is a Lithuanian masculine given name, from Old High German name Waldemar. Its shortened form is Valdas.

The equivalent forms in other languages are:
 Scandinavian, Finnish : Valdemar
 Estonian : Voldemar
 German : Waldemar, Woldemar
 Hungarian : 
 Italian : 
 Latvian : Voldemārs

Individuals with the name Valdemaras include:
Valdemaras Chomičius (born 1959), Soviet and Lithuanian basketball player 
Valdemaras Katkus (born 1958), Lithuanian politician
Valdemaras Martinkėnas (1965–2004), Soviet and Lithuanian footballer 
Valdemaras Venckaitis (born 1983), Lithuanian Greco-Roman wrestler 

Lithuanian masculine given names